

The following lists events that happened during 1915 in Afghanistan.

Incumbents
 Monarch – Habibullah Khan

Events
Afghanistan passes through the year peaceably and the relations of the country with the Indian government are most cordial. Afghanistan presents in these respects a marked contrast to its neighbour, Persia. Both Persia and Afghanistan are nominally sovereign states, but in practice the British Raj is the supreme protecting power in Afghanistan, whereas in Persia, the paramount power is Russia rather than United Kingdom. The difference between the conditions prevailing in the two countries indicates the success of the British in gaining the confidence of a weak nation.

 
Afghanistan
Years of the 20th century in Afghanistan
Afghanistan
1910s in Afghanistan